Simen Hjerkinn Hammershaug (born 2 August 2000) is a Norwegian football striker who plays for Egersund.

A youth product of Lillehammer FK, he transferred to the junior team of Strømsgodset in mid-2016. In 2019 he signed a first-team contract, but was loaned out to Asker for the entire season. He made his Eliteserien debut in November 2020 against Kristiansund. In January 2022, he moved to Egersund on a two-year contract.

References

2000 births
Living people
Sportspeople from Lillehammer
Norwegian footballers
Strømsgodset Toppfotball players
Asker Fotball players
Egersunds IK players
Eliteserien players
Norwegian Second Division players
Association football forwards